Kholkin Konets is a rural locality (a village) in Moseyevskoye Rural Settlement, Totemsky  District, Vologda Oblast, Russia. The population was 11 as of 2002.

Geography 
Kholkin Konets is located 31 km northwest of Totma (the district's administrative centre) by road. Kondratyevskaya is the nearest rural locality.

References 

Rural localities in Tarnogsky District